Mount Carmel Hospital is a mental health hospital located in Attard, offering both in and out-patient service. The inpatient care includes acute care, rehabilitation & long stay, old age & medical care, children and adolescents, learning disability and forensic/prison ward. At Mount Carmel Hospital are assisted patients with mental health problems and supported for their social network.

History
The hospital was built in 1861. In architects warned that the most of the ceilings at the psychiatric hospital were not safe and should be demolished. Since there is cultural heritage regarding the building building, plans were made to keep the façade of the building and rework the interior.

References

Psychiatric hospitals in Malta
Attard
1861 establishments in Malta